The fifth season of Greece's Next Top Model (abbreviated as GNTMgr, also known as Greece's Next Top Model: Boys & Girls) premiered on September 7, 2020 and is the third season to air on Star Channel. For the first time in Greece's Next Top Model, boys can also participate.

Vicky Kaya, Angelos Bratis & Dimitris Skoulos returned as judges, while Genevieve Majari replaced Iliana Papageorgiou as a judge, but she remained as an art director. Also, George Karavas replaced Elena Christopoulou as models' mentor.

The prizes for this season included a two-year modelling contract with Elite Model Management in London, a jewelry set from House of Jewels, a Mitsubishi Space Star and a cash prize of €50,000.

Approximately 10,000 boys & girls applied for the show. Ten girls and also ten boys were chosen to enter into the models' house.

Unlike last year, there isn't any international destination due to COVID-19 pandemic.

The winner of the competition was 20-year-old Iraklis "Hercules" Chuzhinov. He was the show's first male winner.

Cast

Judges
 Vicky Kaya
 Angelos Bratis
 Dimitris Skoulos
 Genevieve Majari

Other cast members
 George Karavas – mentor
 Genevieve Majari – art director

Contestants
(Ages stated are at start of contest)

Episode summaries

Episodes 1–5: Auditions
The show kicked off with the audition phase. This year the auditions took place only in Athens with all safety measures due to COVID-19 pandemic. The auditions aired for the first five episodes of the show. Before the boys and the girls went through to the judges, they are doing an interview and photoshoot with their coach George Karavas. During the auditions, the boys and the girls had a brief interview with the judges while they also walked in swimwear. In order to advance, they needed a "yes" from at least 3 of the judges. This season introduced the Wild Card. Each judge has a Wild Card, if a contestant does not advance to the next round, then a judge can issue his/her Wild Card and the contestant can advance to the Bootcamp.

Episodes 5–6: Bootcamp

First Part: ID catwalk

During the bootcamp, the 84 boys & girls that advanced from the auditions took part. For the first part of the bootcamp, the boys & girls had to makes their own styling and walk in front of the judges. The ID catwalk took place at Athens. 

Second Part: Photoshoot

For the second part of bootcamp, 40 boys and girls were shot by the photographer Panos Giannakopoulos. The photoshoot took place in a pool of a luxury castle house outside of Athens and models wear swimsuits and posed sitting in inflatable sunbed at the pool. Before the second part of bootcamp started, the judges gave Konstantinos Tsentolini a golden pass, so he qualified automatically to the models house. A total of 20 boys and girls passed to the models' house.

Golden Pass Winner: Konstantinos Tsentolini
Featured photographer: Panos Giannakopoulos

Episodes 7–8: Mirror Naked
Original airdate:  - 

First call-out: Emiliano Markou
Bottom two: Alexandra Exarchopoulou and Chrysa Kavraki
Eliminated: Chrysa Kavraki
Featured photographer: Kosmas Koumianos

Episode 9: Beach Fighters
Original airdate: 

First call-out: Edward Stergiou
Bottom two: Alexandra Exarchopoulou and Liia Chuzhdan
Eliminated: Alexandra Exarchopoulou
Featured photographer: Vasilis Topouslidis

Episode 10: Alternative Weddings
Original airdate: 

First call-out: Hercules Tsuzinov and Panagiotis Antonopoulos
Bottom four: Dimosthenis Tzoumanis, Eirini Mitrakou, Panagiotis Petsas and Xenia Motskalidou
Eliminated: Xenia Motskalidou
Featured photographer: Alexandra Argyri

Episode 11: Rotten Royals
Original airdate: 

Challenge Winner: Dimosthenis Tzoumanis
First call-out: Andreas Athanasopoulos
Bottom two: Panagiotis Petsas and Sifis Farantakis
Eliminated: Panagiotis Petsas
Featured photographers: Dimitris Skoulos, Apostolis Koukousas

Episode 12: The Makeover
Original airdate: 

The contestants received their makeovers. There was no panel held.

Challenge Winner: Sifis Faradakis

Episode 13: Crash
Original airdate: 

First call-out: Emiliano Markou
Bottom four: Hercules Tsuzinov, Irida Papoutsi, Liia Chuzhdan and Mariagapi Xypolia
Eliminated: Irida Papoutsi
Featured photographer: Giorgos Kalfamanolis

Episode 14: Pop Extreme
Original airdate: 

Challenge Winners: Andreas Athanasopoulos, Emmanuel Elozieoua & Mariagapi Xypolia
First call-out: Hercules Tsuzinov
Bottom two: Eirini Mitrakou and Liia Chuzhdan
Eliminated: Eirini Mitrakou
Featured photographer: Giorgos Malekakis

Episode 15: Speed To Exceed
Original airdate: 

Challenge Winner: Mariagapi Xypolia
First call-out: Dimosthenis Tzoumanis
Eliminated: Konstantinos Tsentolini
Featured photographer: Panos Georgiou

Episode 16: Underwater
Original airdate: 

Challenge Winner: Sifis Faradakis
First call-out: Emiliano Markou
Bottom two: Paraskevi Kerasioti and Theodora Rachel
Eliminated: Paraskevi Kerasioti
Featured photographers: Alekos Nikolaou, Dionysis Koutsis

Episode 17: Art Director's Show
Original airdate: 

Immune: Emiliano Markou
First call-out: Andreas Athanasopoulos
Bottom two: Emmanuel Elozieoua and Hercules Tsuzinov
Eliminated: Emmanuel Elozieoua
Featured photographer: Aggelos Potamianos

Episode 18: High Parachuting
Original airdate: 

First call-out: Mariagapi Xypolia
Bottom two: Emiliano Markou and Hercules Tsuzinov
Eliminated: Hercules Tsuzinov
Featured photographer: Freddie F

Episode 19: We Love Greece
Original airdate: 

First call-out: Sifis Faradakis
Bottom two: Theodora Rachel and Dimosthenis Tzoumanis
Eliminated: Theodora Rachel
Featured photographer: Stefanos Papadopoulos

Episode 20: Dog Walkers
Original airdate: 

Challenge Winner: Liia Chuzhdan
First call-out: Liia Chuzhdan
Bottom two:  Marinela Zyla and Panagiotis Antonopoulos
Eliminated: Panagiotis Antonopoulos
Featured photographer: Apostolis Koukousas

Episode 21: Tiger & Dragon
Original airdate: 

Returned: Emmanuel Elozieoua, Hercules Tsuzinov, Paraskevi Kerasioti, Xenia Motskalidou
First call-out: Emmanuel Elozieoua & Hercules Tsuzinov
Bottom two: Andreas Athanasopoulos & Sifis Faradakis
Eliminated: Sifis Faradakis
Featured photographer: Mike Tsitas

Episode 22: Distracted
Original airdate: 

Challenge Winner: Liia Chuzhdan
First call-out: Paraskevi Kerasioti
Bottom two: Dimosthenis Tzoumanis and Marinela Zyla
Eliminated: Marinela Zyla
Featured photographer: Thanasis Gatos

Episode 23: Couples On Stilts
Original airdate: 

First call-out: Dimosthenis Tzoumanis
Bottom two: Emmanuel Elozieoua and Mariagapi Xypolia
Eliminated: Emmanuel Elozieoua
Featured photographer: Panagiotis Simopoulos

Episode 24: Scuba Diving
Original airdate: 

Challenge Winner: Emiliano Markou
Featured photographers: Dimitris Skoulos, Panos Georgiou

Episode 25: Urban Superheroes
Original airdate: 

Challenge Winner: Andreas Athanasopoulos
First call-out: Xenia Motskalidou
Bottom two: Dimosthenis Tzoumanis and Mariagapi Xypolia
Eliminated: Dimosthenis Tzoumanis
Featured photographer: Panos Giannakopoulos

Episode 26: Pop Idols
Original airdate: 

Challenge Winner: Hercules Tsuzinov
First call-out: Hercules Tsuzinov
Bottom two: Liia Chuzhdan and Xenia Motskalidou
Eliminated: Liia Chuzhdan
Featured photographer: Freddie F

Episode 27: Sand Dunes
Original airdate: 

First call-out: Paraskevi Kerasioti
Bottom two: Mariagapi Xypolia and Xenia Motskalidou
Eliminated: Xenia Motskalidou
Featured photographer: Marios Kazakos

Episode 28: Dante
Original airdate: 

Challenge Winner: Edward Stergiou
First call-out: Andreas Athanasopoulos
Eliminated: Mariagapi Xypolia
Featured photographers: Kostas Simos, Stefanos Papadopoulos

Episode 29: Bond Models
Original airdate: 

First call-out: Emiliano Markou
Bottom two: Andreas Athanasopoulos and Edward Stergiou	 	 
Eliminated: Edward Stergiou
Featured photographer: Ioanna Tzetzoumi

Episode 30: The Show Must Go On, The Star Of The Night, The Blue Party - Final
Original airdate:

Part 1
Final four: Andreas Athanasopoulos, Emiliano Markou, Hercules Tsuzinov and Paraskevi Kerasioti
Eliminated: Emiliano Markou

Part 2

Final three: Andreas Athanasopoulos, Hercules Tsuzinov and Paraskevi Kerasioti
Third place: Andreas Athanasopoulos
Runner-up: Paraskevi Kerasioti
Winner: Hercules Tsuzinov
Featured photographer: Dimitris Skoulos

Results

 The contestant was eliminated
 The contestant was put through collectively to the next round
 The contestant was immune from elimination
 The contestant won the competition

Bottom two

 The contestant was automatically eliminated by the judges
 The contestant was eliminated after their first time in the bottom two
 The contestant was eliminated after their second time in the bottom two
 The contestant was eliminated after their third time in the bottom two
 The contestant was eliminated after their fourth time in the bottom two
 The contestant was eliminated in the judging and placed fourth
 The contestant was eliminated in the final judging and placed third
 The contestant was eliminated in the final judging and placed as the runner-up

Photo shoot guide 

 Episode 6 photo shoot: Bootcamp Photoshoot
 Episode 7 photo shoot: Mirror Naked
 Episode 9 photo shoot: Beach Fighters
 Episode 10 photo shoot: Alternative Weddings
 Episode 11 photo shoot: Rotten Royals
 Episode 13 photo shoot: Crash
 Episode 14 photo shoot: Pop Extreme
 Episode 15 photo shoot: Speed To Exceed
 Episode 16 photo shoot: Underwater
 Episode 17 photo shoot: Art Director's Show
 Episode 18 photo shoot: High Parachuting
 Episode 19 photo shoot: We Love Greece
 Episode 20 photo shoot: Dog Walkers
 Episode 21 photo shoot: Tiger & Dragon
 Episode 22 photo shoot: Distracted
 Episode 23 photo shoot: Couples On Stilts
 Episode 24 photo shoot: Scuba Diving
 Episode 25 photo shoot: Urban Superheroes
 Episode 26 photo shoot: Pop Idols
 Episode 27 photo shoot: Sand Dunes
 Episode 28 photo shoot: Dante
 Episode 29 photo shoot: Bond Models
 Episode 30 photo shoot: Red carpet and Blue party

Average  call-out order
Episode 15 (except top two and bottom), 28 (Except top & bottom) are not included.

Notes

Ratings

Note

  Outside top 20.

References

Greece
2020 Greek television seasons
Television productions postponed due to the COVID-19 pandemic